The 1961 Critérium du Dauphiné Libéré was the 15th edition of the cycle race and was held from 29 May to 4 June 1961. The race started in Avignon and finished in Grenoble. The race was won by Brian Robinson of the  team.

General classification

References

1961
1961 in French sport
1961 Super Prestige Pernod
May 1961 sports events in Europe
June 1961 sports events in Europe